Antonios Bountouris (born: 1 February 1959) is a sailor from Greece. who represented his country at the 1988 Summer Olympics in Busan, South Korea as crew member in the Soling. With helmsman Tassos Boudouris and fellow crew members Georgios Prekas and Dimitrios Deligiannis they took the 18th place. Antonios was due to illness replaced by Dimitrios after the third race.

References

Living people
1959 births
Sailors at the 1988 Summer Olympics – Soling
Olympic sailors of Greece
Greek male sailors (sport)